Allingdale is an unincorporated community in northeastern Nicholas County, West Virginia, United States. The town is located along West Virginia Route 20, near the intersection with Strouds Creek Road and the Webster County line.

References

Unincorporated communities in Nicholas County, West Virginia
Unincorporated communities in West Virginia